Epopea is a genus of longhorn beetles of the subfamily Lamiinae, containing the following species:

 Epopea acuta Thomson, 1864
 Epopea lignosa Breuning, 1940
 Epopea orientalis Breuning, 1940
 Epopea subacuta Breuning, 1952

References

Pteropliini